Cheng Shuang (born February 11, 1987) is a Chinese female aerial skier who has competed at the 2010 Winter Olympics and the 2014 Winter Olympics.

Cheng won the gold medal in the women's aerials event at the 2011 FIS Freestyle World Ski Championships.

References

External links 
 
 
 
 
 

1987 births
Living people
Skiers from Jilin
Chinese female freestyle skiers
Freestyle skiers at the 2010 Winter Olympics
Freestyle skiers at the 2014 Winter Olympics
Olympic freestyle skiers of China
Universiade medalists in freestyle skiing
Universiade silver medalists for China
Competitors at the 2009 Winter Universiade